Kirsi Maaria Hänninen (born 3 October 1976 in Joensuu, Finland) is a Finnish retired ice hockey defenceman and pesäpallo player. She played 116 games with the Finnish national ice hockey team and won a bronze medal with them in the women's ice hockey tournament at the 1998 Winter Olympics.

Playing career
Over her ten-year ice hockey career, Hänninen played with five different teams in the Naisten SM-sarja, the highest level women's hockey league in Finland. She spent four seasons, from 1996 to 2000, with JYP Jyväskylä and won the SM-sarja Championship with them in 1996 and 1997. She also played with JoKP (1992–93), Kiekko-Espoo (1993–94), KalPa (1995–96), and Oulun Kärpät (2001-02).

Hänninen is well known in Finland for her career in the Superpesis, Finland's top pesäpallo league, where she competed from 1993 to 2005 and was a five-time Finnish Champion.

Personal life 
Hänninen is a founding member of VRT Finland, an underwater structural inspection company operating in the Baltic Sea and Central Europe, and currently serves as CEO of the company.

Awards and honors

References

External links 
 
 

1976 births
Living people
Finnish women's ice hockey defencemen
Ice hockey players at the 1998 Winter Olympics
Ice hockey players at the 2002 Winter Olympics
JYP Jyväskylä Naiset players
KalPa Naiset players
Kiekko-Espoo Naiset players
Medalists at the 1998 Winter Olympics
Olympic bronze medalists for Finland
Olympic ice hockey players of Finland
Olympic medalists in ice hockey
Oulun Kärpät Naiset players
People from Joensuu
Pesäpallo players
Sportspeople from North Karelia